Lycée des métiers Florian is a vocational high school in Sceaux, Hauts-de-Seine, France, in the Paris metropolitan area.

 it has 478 students. Around 2008 enrollment was between 440 and 660.

It was built in 1962. Around 2008 a renovation and construction project designed by Vaudou and Allegret Architects was planned.

References

External links
 Lycée des métiers Florian 

Lycées in Hauts-de-Seine
1962 establishments in France
Educational institutions established in 1962